The St. Louis Gateway Film Critics Association Award for Best Screenplay is one of the annual film awards given by the St. Louis Gateway Film Critics Association.

Winners

2000s

Combined adapted and original

2010s

Adapted

Original

2020s

Adapted

Original

Screenplay
Screenwriting awards for film